Valentin Laurențiu Dumitrache (born 29 March 2003) is a Romanian professional footballer who plays as a central midfielder for Liga I side Farul Constanța .

Club career

Academica Clinceni
He made his league debut on 16 July 2021 in Liga I match against Sepsi OSK.

Career statistics

Club

References

External links
 
 

2003 births
Living people
People from Buzău
Romanian footballers
Association football midfielders
Liga I players
LPS HD Clinceni players
FCV Farul Constanța players